Vinayraoji Vilasrao Kore (born October 4, 1971) is an Indian politician and the President of Shree Warana Industrial and Educational Complex, Warananagar. He was former Minister of Non-Conventional Energy and Horticulture, Government of Maharashtra. He is Founder President of Jan Surajya Shakti.

His grandfather Hon. Sahakarmahrishi Late Shri. Tatyasaheb Kore, incepted Shree Warana Industrial & Educational Complex with first sugar factory of this area 60 years ago.

Under his leadership, Warananagar is now shaped up into an engineering and agricultural town. This small upcoming town, houses the  Warana dairy, Tatyasaheb Kore Institute of Engineering & Technology, Y C Warana Mahavidyalaya, Warananagar, Tatyasaheb Kore College of Pharmacy, dental college, several schools - Shree Warana Vidhyamandir, Shree Warana Vidhyalaya, Tatyasaheb Kore English Academy, Tatyasaheb Kore Military Academy; an agricultural goods processing cooperative society, cooperative supermarket (Warana Bazar), Warana Power Co-operative, a fruit pulp factory, paper factory, a distillery where industrial alcohol is made—the list is endless. Lijjat Papad and Bournvita is also made in Warana.

In collaboration with GOI, Warana Vibhag Shiksan Mandal started Wired Village Project in 1997, which links 70 villages in the area with internet and enables use of various custom built applications to share data across.

Due to efforts put in by the Kore family, highest per capita income in rural India was achieved in the operational area of the Warana Group.

Under his able leadership, a 44 MW Co-Gen project at Warananagar was erected, the first one in the cooperative sector.

He strives to bring his Grandfather's vision into reality - the empowerment of poor & deprived sector of Warana Khore, the farmers, women, rural youths etc. He is fascinated with the aim to make Warana - self reliant.

And hence incepted Surajya Foundation; Vinay Kore MPSC & UPSC guidance Bureau; Vinay Kore Cultural & Sports Facilitation Centre; Vinay Kore Gaurav Pratisthan; Shree Warana Science & Innovation Activity Centre etc. He is from Lingayat community.

He has been honored with many prestigious awards including Fie Foundation Award, Sahakar Shri, Best Entrepreneur of the year, etc.

As a token of recognition of his outstanding contributions in the field of Co-operatives, and considerable Promotion and development of Industries in rural & urban areas; Dr. D.Y. Patil Vidyapeeth, Pune has conferred upon him the Degree of Doctor of Science (Honoris Causa).
He is one of the leaders from Kolhapur.

He is current Member of Maharashtra Legislative Assembly from Shahuwadi constituency since 2019.

Sources
Jan Surajya Shakti Party(Link not working)
Warana Dairy Official Website

Jan Surajya Shakti politicians
Living people
1971 births
Members of the Maharashtra Legislative Assembly
Marathi politicians